Gezira Sporting Club is a basketball club located on the island of Zamalek in Cairo, Egypt that plays in the Egyptian Basketball Super League. The club has won nine league titles, most recently in 2017.

Achievements
Egyptian Basketball Super League
Champions (11): 1973, 1993, 1994, 2002, 2004, 2005, 2006, 2008, 2011, 2014‚ 2017
 Egypt Cup
Champions (4): 1989–90,1993–94, 2004–05, 2018–19
Arab Club Basketball Championship
Champions (2): 2000, 2001
Runners-up (1): 2004
Third place (1): 2005
FIBA Africa Basketball LeagueChampions (2):''' 1994, 1996

Players

Current roster

Notable players

 Amr Gendy (5 seasons: 2013–18)
 Motaz Okasha (2014–present)
 Kenneth Gasana (1 season: 2014–15)
 Stéphane Konaté (1 season: 2013–14)

See also
Gezira Sporting Club

References

External links
Team profile at Afrobasket.com

Basketball teams in Egypt
Sports clubs in Cairo